InfoWorld (abbreviated IW) is an American information technology media business. Founded in 1978, it began as a monthly magazine. In 2007, it transitioned to a web-only publication. Its parent company today is International Data Group, and its sister publications include Macworld and PC World. InfoWorld is based in San Francisco, with contributors and supporting staff based across the U.S..

Since its founding, InfoWorlds readership has largely consisted of IT and business professionals. InfoWorld focuses on how-to, analysis, and editorial content from a mixture of experienced technology journalists and working technology practitioners. The site averages 4.6 million monthly page views and 1.1 million monthly unique visitors.

History
The magazine was founded by Jim Warren in 1978 as The Intelligent Machines Journal (IMJ). It was sold to IDG in late 1979. On 18 February 1980, the magazine name was changed to InfoWorld. In 1986, the Robert X. Cringely column began; for many, that pseudonymous column was the face of InfoWorld and its close ties to Silicon Valley in particular.

Up to and including the 15 June 1987 issue 24, volume 9, InfoWorld was published by Popular Computing, Inc., a subsidiary of CW Communications, Inc. Since then it has been published by InfoWorld Publishing, Inc., a subsidiary of IDG Communications, Inc.

Ethernet inventor Bob Metcalfe was CEO and publisher from 1991 to 1996, and contributed a weekly column until 2000. As the magazine transitioned to be exclusively Web-based, the final print edition was dated 2 April 2007 (Volume 29, Issue 14, Number 1384).

In its web incarnation, InfoWorld has transitioned away from widely available news stories to a focus on how-to, expert testing, and thought leadership.

References

External links
 
 Digitized InfoWorld magazines on Google Books

Monthly magazines published in the United States
Defunct computer magazines published in the United States
International Data Group
Magazines established in 1978
Magazines disestablished in 2007
Magazines published in San Francisco
Online computer magazines
Online magazines with defunct print editions